= Lhasa-Beijing Experimental Middle School =

School in Lhasa, Tibet, China

Lhasa-Beijing Experimental Middle School (Chinese: 拉萨市北京实验中学), or Lhasa Beijing Experimental High School (Chinese: 拉萨北京实验中学), formerly known as Lhasa Second Senior High School (Chinese: 拉萨第二高中) is a middle school in Lhasa, Tibet.

== History ==
Formerly known as Lhasa No.3 Middle School in 1978, it was changed to Lhasa No.2 Higher Secondary School in 1997. The school is located in Lhasa's Dongcheng Education City, and was later renamed Lhasa Beijing Experimental Middle School after Beijing's wholly funded aid in 2014. It is one of the first model high schools in the Tibet Autonomous Region.
